Pandavaru is a 2006 Indian Kannada-language film directed by K. V. Raju. The film is a remake of Godfather (1991). The film is about five brothers played by Ambareesh, Devaraj, Jaggesh, Ramkumar and Abhijith. The film was released on 10 November 2006 alongside Hubballi.

Cast 

Ambareesh as Kempegowda 
Devaraj as Devanna
Jaggesh
Ramkumar
Abhijith
Gurleen Chopra
Tara
Nagasekhar
Aishwarya 
Satyaprakash
Ramesh Bhat
Sathyajith
Shashi Kumar

Production 
After failing to establish himself as a successful actor, Ramkumar ventured into production with this film.

Reception 
A critic from Rediff.com wrote that "Pandavaru is a good one time watch as it essentially entertains without allowing the viewers to think. It is faithful to the original, and the artists have done well". A critic from Filmibeat wrote that "Overall, a good entertainer". A critic from Indiaglitz wrote that "The other two plus points in Pandavaru are music and cinematography. Hamsalekha gives three lovely tunes and the lyrics are quite impressive. Dasari Seenu handling the action scenes and lot of characters in the frame deserves appreciation". Film critic R. G. Vijayasarthy wrote that "Pandavaru is an enjoyable film, but the fact that it is a remake with less of sensitivity and more of crudity may be a negative factor".

References

Notes 

Kannada remakes of Malayalam films